Greenbelt Electric Cooperative, Inc. is a non-profit rural electric utility cooperative headquartered in Wellington, Texas.

The Cooperative was organized in 1938.

The Cooperative serves portions of nine counties in the state of Texas, all located in the Texas Panhandle, in a territory generally surrounding Wellington.

External links
Greenbelt Electric Cooperative

Companies based in Texas
Electric cooperatives in Texas
Armstrong County, Texas
Childress County, Texas
Collingsworth County, Texas
Donley County, Texas
Gray County, Texas
Hemphill County, Texas
Randall County, Texas
Roberts County, Texas
Wheeler County, Texas